Im or Lim is a common Korean family name. The surname is identical to the Chinese character of the same name. According to the initial law of the Korean language, both "Im" and "Lim" are interchangeable.

History
The first clan branch is the Supul Rim (수풀 림, meaning "Forest-Rim") and its Hanja character is 林. The Supul Rim or Lim or Im branch consists of two large clan houses; the first is Naju (early Hoijin) and the second, which is the elder branch, is Pyeongtaek. Members of this branch often write their names as both 임 (Im; more common) and 림 (Rim or Lim; initial law). The character 林 means "forest".

The second clan branch is the Matgil Im (맡길 임) or Mateul Im (맡을 임) and its Hanja character is 任. The Matgil Im/Mateul Im branch consists of one large clan house called Pungcheon Im clan and a smaller clan house called Jangheung (장흥). Members of this clan branch both write and pronounce their names as 임 (Im). The character 任 means "trusted/to bear, duty".

Romanization
When 林 (림 or 임) is romanized, it is spelled as "Rim" or "Im" in McCune–Reischauer and Revised Romanization of Korean, as "Lim".

When 任 (임) is romanized, it is spelled as "Im" in McCune–Reischauer and Revised Romanization of Korean, or sometimes spelled "Yim".

Statistics from the year 2000 show that there were 762,767 수풀 림 (林, Rim) and 172,726 맡길 임 (任, Im) in South Korea.

Notable people of the past
The following is a list of notable people of the past with the Korean family name Im/Lim/Rim. People should only be included in this list if they have their own Wikipedia articles or if they are discussed in a non-trivial fashion in Wikipedia articles on notable groups or events with which they are associated. Pratt's list contains 8 names.

Im Sahong (1445–1506)
Im Kkeokjeong (fl. 1559-1562), leader of the Hwanghae peasant rebellion (Noklimdang). 
Im Che (1549-1587), pen name "Paekho", poet of the Joseon period.
Im Gyeong-eop (1594 – 1646), general of the Joseon period, instrumental in protecting Korea from Manchu invasion.
Im Yunjidang (1721-1793), she wrote the Yunjidang Yugo.
Im Sang-ok (1779–1885),  a major ginseng trader of Joseon.

Notable people of the recent times
Im Jae-hyuk, South Korean part-time actor
Dami Im, Australian-Korean singer and songwriter
Im Chang-kyun (stage name I.M), South Korean rapper and member of boy group Monsta X
Im Chang-jung, South Korean actor and singer
Im Dong-hyun, South Korean archer
Im Heung-soon, South Korean artist and director
Im Jin-ah (stage name Nana), South Korean singer, actress, and model, member of After School
Im Kwon-taek, South Korean film director
Im Na-yeon, South Korean singer and member of girl group Twice
Im Sang-soo, South Korean film director
Im Se-mi, South Korean actress 
Im Si-wan, South Korean singer and actor, member of boy group ZE:A
Im So-eun (stage name NC.A), South Korean singer 
Im Soo-hyang, South Korean actress
Im Soo-jung, South Korean actress
Im Sung-han, South Korean television screenwriter
Danny Im (stage name Taebin), Korean-American singer and member of group 1TYM
Im Won-sik, Korean conductor, composer, and educator
Im Yoon-ah, South Korean singer and actress, member of girl group Girls' Generation 
Lim Hyung-joo, South Korean operatic pop (popera) tenor and classical crossover singer
Lim Chang-yong, South Korean baseball pitcher
Dong-Hyek Lim, South Korean classical pianist
Lim Dong-won, retired South Korean politician
Lim Eun-ji, South Korean pole vaulter
Lim Hyo-jun, South Korean short track speed skater, Olympic gold medalist
Lim Jae-beom (stage name Jay B), South Korean singer and actor, member of boy band Got7
Im Hyun-sik, South Korean singer and member of boy band BtoB
Lim Jeong-hee, South Korean singer
Lim Jeong-hyun, South Korean guitarist
Lim Ju-hwan, South Korean actor
Lim Na-young, South Korean singer, member of South Korean girl groups I.O.I and Pristin
Lim Seulong, South Korean singer and actor, member of boy group 2AM
Lim Sungbin (stage name Beenzino), South Korean rapper
Lim Yo-hwan, South Korean former professional StarCraft player
Rhim Ju-yeon, South Korean comics writer
Rim Jong-sim, North Korean Olympic weightlifter
Yim Bang-eun, South Korean badminton player
Yim Soon-rye, South Korean film director
Yim Sung-ah, South Korean professional golfer
Lim Young-woong, South Korean trot singer

See also
List of Korean family names

Notes

References

Korean-language surnames